Don Bosco Technical College, also referred to by its acronym DBTC or Don Bosco Mandaluyong, is a private Catholic basic and higher education institution run by the Salesians of the Society of Saint John Bosco in Mandaluyong, Metro Manila, Philippines. Established in 1953 by the Salesians, it is the first Don Bosco Educational Center in Metro Manila. Don Bosco Mandaluyong offers co-educational primary (elementary) and secondary education (junior high school), co-educational senior high school and college (tertiary education), night school (alternative learning system), and vocational training for out-of-school youth.

The college department was formerly exclusive for males until 2004, when the department started accepting female students. DBTC has been starting to accept female students in SY 2020–2021. Following the nationwide implementation of K-12, DBTC implemented the co-educational senior high school program in 2016.

It is part of the IUS or the Istituzioni Universitarie Salesiane (Salesian University Institutions), the Don Bosco Educational Apostolate of the Philippines and the Don Bosco Philippines North Province (DB-FIN). Don Bosco Mandaluyong was awarded the ISO 9001:2000 certification (Certificate No. 6720) by Moody International Certification (Malaysia) Sdn. Bhd. and United Kingdom Accreditation Service.

Don Bosco Mandaluyong was envisaged as one of the "big three" schools in Mandaluyong, together with La Salle Green Hills and Lourdes School of Mandaluyong, which also offer all-boys elementary and secondary education. However, of the three, only Lourdes School of Mandaluyong remained an all-boys school by AY2020-2021. DBTC is deemed the "motherhouse of all Salesian works in the Philippines," making it the premier Salesian institution for higher learning in the country. Its campus is located at 736 General Kalentong Street in Mandaluyong, Metro Manila, Philippines.

History

18th-19th centuries
Don Bosco Technical College stands on historic grounds. The 18th-century Spanish building (1716) at the heart of the campus is a testimony to events that led to the 1896 uprising of the country's patriots, the Katipuneros, against the Spanish colonizers.

The building later became the Asilo de Mandaloya, an orphanage where Mother Consuelo Barcelo y Pages stayed for 16 years (1883–1899). She co-founded the Augustinian Sisters of Our Lady of Consolation.

20th century
Early in the 20th century, the building became the San Carlos Seminary, home for the formation of the local clergy. One of them was Rufino Cardinal Santos, the first Filipino cardinal of the Church.

Don Bosco Mandaluyong opened as a school aptly named "Don Bosco Technical Institute–Mandaluyong" on 2 June 1953 with 47 first-year high school students.

Present day
Since its foundation, Don Bosco Mandaluyong has grown into a complex setting that serves almost 4,000 students and 40,000 parishioners. Its services include the Basic Education Department, College Department, Industrial Technicians Course, Manpower Skills and Training Center, Center for Research and Training, Information Systems and Technology Center, Don Bosco Youth Center, St. Dominic Savio Parish, and Pinardi Boarding House.

Seal

The seal is bordered on top by the school's motto: Ascende Superius, which means "come up to a higher place".

At the center of the seal is a cross, symbolizing the primacy of Christian Catholic education and formation of the institution. The cross rests on a salakot - a traditional Filipino hat - to signify the distinct Filipino character.

Between the horizontal section of the cross and the salakot is the founding year of the school, 1953, appearing atop three lines. The lines represent the three elements of Don Bosco's Preventive System of Education, namely: Reason (principle-driven life), Religion (spirituality) and Loving Kindness (connectedness and mutuality). The lines which resemble waves, daluyong in the local language, recall the legendary origin of the community of Mandaluyong. Tradition has it that the name of the city where the school is located originated from the abundance of the waves or "mga daluyong".

The half-gear on the left and the laurel leaves on the right that surround the central design are emblematic respectively of technical and academic education. This seal in its current form was first used in 1988–89. The original seal consisted only of the blue-green half-gear and laurel leaves.

Programs offered

Basic Education Department
The Don Bosco Technical College-BED (Basic Education Department) consists of three programs, namely the Grade School, the Junior High School and the Senior High School.

Don Bosco Mandaluyong has a dual academic-technical curriculum since its foundation in 1953. Students take both standard academic courses prescribed by the Department of Education (Philippines). Technical studies are the equivalent of the standard Technology and Livelihood Education subject in other schools, with the subjects focusing more on future occupations connected to engineering and technology.

Grade School
The Don Bosco Technical College-Grade School is a Catholic elementary school for boys and girls, offering Grades 1 until Grade 6. The Grade School Program advocates Information Literacy as its approach to the basic curriculum required by the Department of Education. Its entire program is located in the Dona Cecilia Building and the Savio Quadrangle beside the High School Building.

The technical subjects are offered throughout the four years of Grade School, with computer technology taken during the four years and all technical subjects taken during fourth, fifth, and sixth grades.

Technical subjects:
Computer Information Technology
Work Education (includes Mechanical, Electronics, Electrical, and Drafting Technology) (For Grades 4 and above)
Robotics

Junior high school

The Don Bosco Technical College-Junior High School is a Catholic secondary school, with a population of approximately 1,000 students. Its entire program is located in the High School Building (formerly the Blessed Philip Rinaldi Building) and the Savio Quadrangle beside the Dona Cecilia Building.

The technical subjects are offered throughout the four years of Junior High School, with general technology subjects taken during seventh and eighth grades and a chosen specialization in the ninth and tenth grades (based on previous grades and a written placement exam).

Technical specializations:
Computer Technology
Mechanical Technology
Electronics Technology
Industrial Electricity
Drafting Technology (only seventh and eighth grades)

Senior High School

Tracks offered:

STEM (Science, Technology, Engineering, and Math)
ABM (Accountancy, Business, and Management)
DMT (Digital Media Technology)

College Department
Programs offered:

Bachelor of Science in Architecture
Bachelor of Science in Computer Engineering
Bachelor of Science in Electronics and Communications Engineering
Bachelor of Science in Mechanical Engineering
Bachelor of Science in Information Technology
Bachelor of Science in Computer Science
Bachelor of Science in Entrepreneurship
Associate in Computer Technology

TVET Department

The TVET (Technical Vocational Education and Training Center; formerly the Manpower Skills and Training Center) was established in 1971 primarily to assist the youth of various communities by offering technical training as a means of acquiring manpower skills.

Fields offered:
Domestic Refrigiration and Air-conditioning (DOMRAC) NCII
Machining NCII
Electrical Installation Maintenance (EIM) NCII
Mechatronics Servicing NCII

Aircraft Maintenance Technology

Aircraft Maintenance Technology is a 2-year technician program within the DBTC campus, plus a 3-month Supervised In-Plant Training (SIPT) in reputable companies and industrial workplaces.
Students are taught to have mastery over reciprocating machines and familiarity in jet engine operations.  This program enables to become specialized technicians in both Airframe and Powerplant, and are qualified to continue towards a bachelor's degree in Aeronautical Engineering and in related fields.

Affiliations and accreditations
Don Bosco Mandaluyong is a member school of the National Collegiate Athletic Association (Philippines) South, which consists of schools from the Calabarzon Region (south of Metro Manila) and most central and southern parts of the National Capital Region. Distinguished from the NCAA Philippines-Main, NCAA-South's founding members were mostly sister schools of the NCAA-Main member schools. Don Bosco Technical College played host to the 2007-2008 ninth NCAA Philippines-South season.

National academic, non-athletic affiliations and accreditations include the Philippine Accrediting Association of Schools, Colleges and Universities (PAASCU), Commission on Higher Education (Philippines) (CHED), the Don Bosco-FIN Office for the Development of the Educational Apostolate, and the Department of Education (Philippines) (DepEd).

International affiliations are the Istituzioni Universitarie Salesiane (IUS), corresponding to the international recognition of being a Salesian institution, the Moody International Certification (International Organization for Standardization), and the United Kingdom Accreditation Service (UKAS).

Notable alumni

Benjamin Abalos, Jr. - former Mayor of Mandaluyong, former MMDA Chairman, Campaign Manager of Ferdinand "Bongbong" Marcos, Jr. and Secretary of Department of Interior and Local Government
Jose Isidro Camacho - Banker and former Secretary of the Departments of Finance and Energy
Ricky Davao - Filipino Actor, Television Director and Industrial Management Engineer
Vince Dizon - Filipino Economist, Consultant and Political Aide, former President and CEO of the Bases Conversion and Development Authority., served under as President Rodrigo Duterte's Adviser on Flagship Programs and Projects and as Deputy Chief Implementer of the National Action Plan Against *COVID-19.
Gregorio Honasan - former Senator of the Republic of the Philippines and AFP Officer
Francis Magalona - Filipino Rapper, Singer and Songwriter, widely regarded as "The Filipino King of Rap" and often credited as the Pioneer of Pinoy Hip-Hop
Manuel L. Quezon III - Writer and Television Host
Rod Espinosa - Filipino Comics Creator, Writer, and Illustrator.
Joem Bascon - Filipino Actor under ABS-CBN's talent management arm, Star Magic.

References

 About Don Bosco Technical College - Mandaluyong. Retrieved on April 27, 2006.
 Don Bosco Technical College - Mandaluyong. Retrieved on February 21, 2018.

Catholic universities and colleges in Metro Manila
Mandaluyong
Catholic secondary schools in Metro Manila
National Collegiate Athletic Association – South
Educational institutions established in 1953
1953 establishments in the Philippines
Education in Mandaluyong
Engineering universities and colleges in the Philippines